Cerekvice nad Loučnou is a municipality and village in Svitavy District in the Pardubice Region of the Czech Republic. It has about 900 inhabitants.

Administrative parts
The village of Pekla is an administrative part of Cerekvice nad Loučnou.

References

Villages in Svitavy District